11th TFCA Awards
December 18, 2007

Best Film: 
 No Country for Old Men 
The 11th Toronto Film Critics Association Awards, honoring the best in film for 2007, were given on 18 December 2007.

Winners
Best Actor: 
Viggo Mortensen – Eastern Promises
Runners-Up: George Clooney – Michael Clayton and Gordon Pinsent – Away from Her
 
Best Actress (tie): 
Julie Christie – Away from Her
Elliot Page – Juno
Runner-Up: Laura Dern – Inland Empire

Best Animated Film: 
Ratatouille
Runners-Up: Paprika and The Simpsons Movie

Best Canadian Film: 
Away from Her
Runners-Up: Eastern Promises and Radiant City

Best Director: 
Joel and Ethan Coen – No Country for Old Men
Runners-Up: David Cronenberg – Eastern Promises and David Fincher – Zodiac

Best Documentary Film: 
No End in Sight
Runners-Up: Iraq in Fragments and My Kid Could Paint That

Best Film: 
No Country for Old Men
Runners-Up: Eastern Promises and Zodiac

Best First Feature: 
Away from Her
Runners-Up: Gone Baby Gone and Michael Clayton
 
Best Foreign Language Film: 
4 Months, 3 Weeks and 2 Days • Romania
Runners-Up: The Diving Bell and the Butterfly • France and The Lives of Others • Germany

Best Screenplay: 
No Country for Old Men – Joel and Ethan Coen 
Runners-Up: Juno – Diablo Cody and Michael Clayton – Tony Gilroy

Best Supporting Actor: 
Javier Bardem – No Country for Old Men
Runners-Up: Casey Affleck – The Assassination of Jesse James by the Coward Robert Ford and Philip Seymour Hoffman – Charlie Wilson's War

Best Supporting Actress:
Cate Blanchett – I'm Not There
Runners-Up: Amy Ryan – Gone Baby Gone and Tilda Swinton – Michael Clayton

Notes

References

2007
2007 film awards
2007 in Toronto
2007 in Canadian cinema